

K

K